Blaze Island is an island located within western Coronation Gulf's Richardson Bay, south of Victoria Island, in the Kitikmeot Region, Nunavut, Canada.

Other islands in the vicinity include Kigirktaryuk Island, Onitkok Island, Seven Mile Island, as well as the Couper Islands and the Nichols Islands. The community of Kugkluktuk (formerly Coppermine) is located on the mainland,  to the southwest.

References

Islands of Coronation Gulf
Uninhabited islands of Kitikmeot Region